Revolution is an American newspaper and official organ of the Revolutionary Communist Party, USA and has been published continuously since 1979.

Originally called The Worker, it was published in English, Spanish and Chinese. In 1979, the name was changed to Revolutionary Worker, reflecting it being published by the Revolutionary Communist Party (RCP) USA with 19 local editions of the newspaper with 9 of the 19 published twice a month. The Party later on decided on a weekly magazine format renamed Revolution. Revolution is a periodic Print Newspaper and updated daily online.

References

External links
Official website

Communist magazines
English-language magazines
Magazines established in 1997
Magazines published in Chicago
Political magazines published in the United States
Revolutionary Communist Party, USA
Weekly magazines published in the United States